Nanny Götha Lovise (Louise) Bäckman (15 November 19264 October 2021) was a Swedish-Sámi religious researcher.

Biography 
After academic studies, she received her doctorate at Stockholm University in 1975 with a thesis in the history of religion on Sámi protective spirits (sáiva). Bäckman was a professor of religious history at Stockholm University. She was a member of the Nathan Söderblom Society and one of the founding members of the Stockholm Sami Association in 1947. 

In her research, Bäckman highlighted the Sámi and, among other things, wrote about noaidis, or Sámi shamans, the bear in Sámi tradition, and the Sámi and settlers. She received an honorary doctorate in 2003 at Umeå University. In 2010, Bäckman received the year's development award from the Sámi Women's Forum.

Selected bibliography 

 Louise Bäckman: Study in the pre-Christian Sámi's conceptions of the underworld with emphasis on the Scandinavian Sámi, Stockholm University, Department of the History of Religions 1964
 Louise Bäckman: Sájva: notions of help and protection in sacred mountains among the Sámi, Stockholm Studies in Comparative Religion no. 13, thesis at Stockholm University 1975
 Louise Bäckman and Åke Hultcrantz: Studies in Lapp shamanism, Stockholm Studies in Comparative Religion no. 16, Stockholm University 1978
 Louise Bäckman and Rolf Kjellström (eds.): Kristoffer Sjulsson's memories: About the Vapstenlapparna in the early 1800s, Nordic Museum 1979 in the series Acta Laponica, no. 20, ISBN 917-108-129-1

References 

1926 births
2021 deaths
Sámi women academics
Swedish women academics
Swedish Sámi academics